Aamer Mirza (born 11 June 1965 in Peshawar) is a Pakistani former first-class cricketer active 1983–1987 who played for Peshawar. Aamer Mirza was a right-handed batsman and a right-arm off break bowler. He scored 1,174 career runs with a highest score of 105*. He took 25 wickets in his 25 first-class appearances with a best innings performance of six for 29.

References

1966 births
Pakistani cricketers
Peshawar cricketers
Living people